The 17th FINA World Junior Artistic Swimming Championships was held from 23 to 27 August 2022 at Desjardins Aquatic Centre in Quebec City, Quebec, Canada. Competition was open to individuals between 15 and 18 years of age, inclusive, per their age at the end of the 2022 calendar year. It was the first FINA World Junior Artistic Swimming Championships to allow men to compete as individuals (in solo events).

In April 2022, FINA banned all Belarusian and Russian athletes and officials from the Championships due to the 2022 Russian invasion of Ukraine.

Results

Women

 Individual was a reserve competitor.

Men

Mixed

Medal table

References

External links
 Official website
 Results

FINA World Junior Synchronised Swimming Championships
2022 in synchronized swimming
Synchronized swimming in Canada
August 2022 sports events in Canada
2020s in Quebec City
2022 in Quebec